Anemia mexicana, the Mexican flowering fern,  is a fern species in the genus Anemia, sometimes called flowering ferns. It is native to much of Mexico and the Edwards Plateau and Trans-Pecos regions of Texas. The "flowers" are upright fertile fronds that can be mistaken for true flowers.

References

External links

Schizaeales
Ferns of Mexico
Plants described in 1845